Wildenrath is a township within the municipality of Wegberg in North Rhine-Westphalia,  Germany. The town is situated on the Bundesstraße 221 between  Wassenberg and Arsbeck on the edge of Maas-Schwalm-Nette Nature Park and close to the border with the Netherlands.

For 40 years, the town was the home of  the British military airfield, RAF Wildenrath. After the airfield closed in 1992, it became the Test- and Validationcenter Wegberg-Wildenrath, a railway test centre operated by Siemens Mobility.

Climate
Climate in this area has mild differences between highs and lows, and there is adequate rainfall year-round.  The Köppen Climate Classification subtype for this climate is "Cfb" (Marine West Coast Climate/Oceanic climate).

References

External links

Former municipalities in North Rhine-Westphalia